Aureispira marina  is a bacterium from the genus of Aureispira which has been isolated from a marine sponge and an algae from the coastline of Thailand.

References 

Sphingobacteriia
Bacteria described in 2006